Eva Díaz may refer to:
 Eva Diaz (Arizona politician), Arizona state senator
 Eva Díaz Pérez (born 1930), Spanish teacher and mathematician

 Eva Díaz Tezanos (born 1964), Spanish politician
 Eva Díaz Torres (1943–1993), Uruguayan artist